Pedro Tapia, O.P. (March 1582 – 25 August 1657) was a Roman Catholic prelate who served as Archbishop of Seville (1652–1657), Bishop of Córdoba (1649–1652), Bishop of Sigüenza (1644–1645), and Bishop of Segovia (1641–1644).

Biography
Pedro Tapia was born in Villorios, Spain in March 1582 and ordained a priest in the Order of Preachers.
On 7 January 1641, he was appointed during the papacy of Pope Urban VIII as Bishop of Segovia.
On 25 July 1641, he was consecrated bishop by Antonio Sotomayor, Titular Archbishop of Damascus, with Francisco Pérez Roya, Bishop of Perpignan-Elne, and Fernando Montero Espinosa, Bishop of Nueva Segovia,  serving as co-consecrators.
On 8 September 1644, he was selected by the King of Spain and confirmed by Pope Innocent X on 24 April 1645 as Bishop of Sigüenza.
On 23 August 1649, he was appointed during the papacy of Pope Innocent X as Bishop of Córdoba.
On 23 September 1652, he was appointed during the papacy of Pope Innocent X as Archbishop of Seville.
He served as Archbishop of Seville until his death on 25 August 1657.

While bishop, he was the principal consecrator of Juan Arroyo, Auxiliary Bishop of Seville (1655).

References

External links and additional sources
 (for Chronology of Bishops) 
 (for Chronology of Bishops) 
 (for Chronology of Bishops) 
 (for Chronology of Bishops) 
 (for Chronology of Bishops) 
 (for Chronology of Bishops) 
 (for Chronology of Bishops) 
 (for Chronology of Bishops) 

17th-century Roman Catholic bishops in Spain
Bishops appointed by Pope Urban VIII
Bishops appointed by Pope Innocent X
1582 births
1657 deaths
Dominican bishops
17th-century Spanish philosophers
17th-century Spanish Roman Catholic theologians